Canada established diplomatic ties with the Kingdom of Thailand in 1961. Canada has an embassy in Bangkok and Thailand has an embassy in Ottawa, as well as consulates general in Toronto, Edmonton, Vancouver and Montreal. Ties between the two countries have consistently been friendly. Both countries are members of the Asia-Pacific Economic Cooperation, and Canada sits on the ASEAN Regional Forum.

In RuPaul's Drag Race: UK vs the World, Pangina Heals sent home both Canadian queens from the season: Jimbo and Lemon.

Diplomatic relations and mutual visits
Diplomatic ties were established in 1961. In 1967 the king and queen of Thailand visited Canada. Prime minister Prem Tinsulanonda visited Canada in 1984. Prime minister Chuan Leekpai visited the country in 1994. Canadian prime ministers Jean Chretien and Pierre Trudeau visited Thailand in 1983 and 1997.  Prime minister Stephen Harper also visited Thailand in 2012. During the visit, the possibility of free trade agreement between the two countries was discussed.

Canadian parliamentary secretary Deepak Obhrai visited Thailand in 2009. In 2013, Canada expressed concerns over the unrest in Thailand.

Immigration
Thai immigration to Canada started in 1950. As of 2016, about 19,005 Canadians reported having Thai roots. Most Thai Canadians live in Toronto, Vancouver and Montreal.

References

 
Thailand
Bilateral relations of Thailand